The Royston River, an inland perennial river of the Goulburn Broken catchment, part of the Murray-Darling basin, is located in the lower South Eastern Highlands bioregion and Northern Country/North Central regions of the Australian state of Victoria. The headwaters of the Royston River rise on the western slopes of the Victorian Alps and descend to flow into the Rubicon River.

Location and features

The Royston River rises from the Great Dividing Range near Lake Mountain and below Royston Gap, and flows northwest, fueled by runoff from the Federation and Royston Ranges before reaching its confluence with the Rubicon River, near . The river descends  over its  course.

The Royston Power Station, part of the Rubicon Hydroelectric Scheme, a small run-of-the-river hydroelectric scheme, is located at the mouth of the Royston River, where the river is impounded by a  concrete slab and buttress that diverts water into an aqueduct that carries water for  into the neighbouring Rubicon Valley to the Royston Power Station forebay. Water from the power station outlet discharges into the Rubicon aqueduct about halfway along its length. The Scheme is on the Victorian Heritage Register and the Register of the National Estate.

The river is not readily accessible nor heavily fished in its lower reaches.

Etymology
The name of the river is thought to be named by the Victorian State Electricity Commission after an employee. An alternate theory suggests that the river was named in honour of Brigadier John Robinson Royston, a South African who led Australian troops in the Boer War and the First World War. The name of the river is ultimately derived from Royston, Hertfordshire.

See also

References

Goulburn Broken catchment
Rivers of Hume (region)
Tributaries of the Goulburn River
Victorian Alps